Zhanqian District is a district of the city of Yingkou, Liaoning, People's Republic of China.

Administrative Divisions
There are seven subdistricts within the district.

Subdistricts:
Yuejin Subdistrict, Jianshe Subdistrict, Batiandi Subdistrict, Dongfeng Subdistrict, Xinxing Subdistrict, Jianfeng Subdistrict, Xinjian Subdistrict

References

External links

County-level divisions of Liaoning
Yingkou